
Year 881 (DCCCLXXXI) was a common year starting on Sunday of the Julian calendar.

Events 
 By place 
 Europe 
 February 12 – King Charles the Fat, the third son of the late Louis the German, is crowned as Holy Roman Emperor by Pope John VIII at Rome.
 August 3 – Battle of Saucourt-en-Vimeu: The West Frankish kings Louis III, and his brother Carloman II, rout Viking raiders (near Abbeville).

 Britain 
 Battle of the Conwy: King Anarawd of Gwynedd (Wales) initiates a revenge attack on the Mercian armies, and defeats them on the River Conwy.
 Anarawd, and his brothers Cadell and Merfyn, begin extensive military campaigns to quell resistance in Powys and Seisyllwg (approximate date).

 Arabian Empire 
 Zanj Rebellion: Abbasid general Al-Muwaffaq lays siege to the Zanj capital of Mukhtara, using his base on the opposite side of the River Tigris.

 Asia 
 Bakong, the first temple mountain of sandstone, is constructed by rulers of the Khmer Empire (modern Cambodia) at Angkor.
881 Acre earthquake. It took place in the vicinity of Acre. Alexandria was reportedly affected by the same earthquake.

 By topic 
 Religion 
 St. Cecilia's Church (Cäcilienkirche) is founded as a college for women. It is now home of the Schnütgen Museum in Cologne.

Births 
 Conrad I, king of the East Frankish Kingdom (approximate date)
 Hugh of Arles, king of Italy and Lower Burgundy (or 880)
 Liu Churang, Chinese general (d. 943)

Deaths 
 December 7 – Anspert, archbishop of Milan
 Bárid mac Ímair, king of Dublin
 Cui Hang, chancellor of the Tang Dynasty
 David I, prince of Iberia (Georgia)
 Gabriel, prince of Kakheti (Georgia)
 Guaifer, duke of Benevento
 John I, Frankish abbot (approximate date)
 Liu Ye, chancellor of the Tang Dynasty
 Lu Guimeng, Chinese poet
 Odo I, bishop of Beauvais
 Orso I, doge of Venice
 Radi Abdullah, Muslim tenth Imam
 Zhang Zhifang, Chinese general

References

Sources